Ray Amoo is a Nigerian professional fly/super fly/bantamweight boxer of the 1970s and '80s who won the Commonwealth flyweight title, and was a challenger for the West African Boxing Union flyweight title against Nana Yaw Konadu.

References

External links

Bantamweight boxers
Flyweight boxers
Place of birth missing (living people)
Super-flyweight boxers
Year of birth missing (living people)
Nigerian male boxers
Living people